Marlers is a commune in the Somme department in Hauts-de-France in northern France.

Geography

History
The commune was called Marles on the 19th century Cassini map.

Population

Places of interest
 The war memorial

See also
Communes of the Somme department

References

Communes of Somme (department)